John Jairo Lozano Castaño (born 31 July 1984) is a Colombian football defender who currently plays for Atlético Huila.

Career
Lozano began his youth career with Deportivo Pereira and made his first team debut with the club in 2003. He remained at the club for seven seasons making 68 appearances and scoring 4 goals. His play with Pereira led to interest from top Colombian side América de Cali who signed Lozano in the summer of 2010. Lozano began the 2011 pre-season with América before going on trial with top Argentine club Boca Juniors. After his trial stint with Boca, Lozano returned to América for the 2011 season. 
 While with América Lozano was a starter for the club making 43 appearances and scoring two goals as a central defender.

On January 9, 2012 it was announced that Lozano would be joining New England Revolution in Major League Soccer.

Lozano was waived by New England on June 27, 2012.

References

External links
 
 
 
 
 

1984 births
Living people
Colombian footballers
Deportivo Pereira footballers
América de Cali footballers
New England Revolution players
Cúcuta Deportivo footballers
Atlético Huila footballers
Colombian expatriate footballers
Expatriate soccer players in the United States
Categoría Primera A players
Major League Soccer players
Association football defenders
Sportspeople from Valle del Cauca Department